College Scandal is a 1935 American comedy film directed by Elliott Nugent and written by Frank Partos, Charles Brackett and Marguerite Roberts. The film stars Arline Judge, Kent Taylor, Wendy Barrie, William Frawley, Benny Baker, William Benedict and Mary Nash. The film was released on June 21, 1935, by Paramount Pictures.

Plot
Julie Fresnel, the daughter of a new French professor on the campus of Rudgate College, becomes the center of all attractions. One of her admirers get murdered, followed by a second and a third one. Eventually, she is rescued from a house with a time bomb.

Cast 
Arline Judge as Sally Dunlap
Kent Taylor as Seth Dunlap
Wendy Barrie as Julie Fresnel
William Frawley as Chief of Police Magoun
Benny Baker as 'Cuffie' Lewis
William Benedict as 'Penny' Parker 
Mary Nash as Mrs. Fresnel
Edward Nugent as Jake Lansing
William Stack as Dr. Henri Fresnel
Johnny Downs as Paul Gedney
Robert Kent as Dan Courtridge 
Joyce Compton as Toby Carpenter
Samuel S. Hinds as Mr. Cummings
Douglas Wood as Dean Traynor
Edith Arnold as Posey
Helena Phillips Evans as Melinda
Mary Ellen Brown as Marjorie
Stanley Andrews as Jim 
Oscar Smith as Generation Jones
Oscar Rudolph as Olson

References

External links 
 

1935 films
1930s comedy mystery films
American black-and-white films
American comedy mystery films
Films directed by Elliott Nugent
Films set in universities and colleges
Paramount Pictures films
1935 comedy films
1930s English-language films
1930s American films